Beehive is an unincorporated community located in Stillwater County, Montana, United States, which shares the ZIP code with Absarokee of 59001.

Beehive is at an elevation of 4,629 feet and appears on the Beehive U.S. Geological Survey Map.

History

Beehive was established as a town in a deep valley along the Stillwater River, west of Absarokee. Beehive had a post office from 1910 to 1953. The community is still a getaway destination with many seasonal mountain homes.

References

Unincorporated communities in Stillwater County, Montana
Unincorporated communities in Montana